The Polish stage of the UEFA Regions' Cup is the Polish football tournament for amateur teams who represent the Polish regions. It has been played since 1999 as qualification for the UEFA Regions' Cup.

Champions
1999 - Małopolska (Lesser Poland)
2000/01 - Mazowsze (Masovia)
2002/03 - Małopolska (Lesser Poland)
2004/05 - Małopolska (Lesser Poland)
2006/07 - Dolny Śląsk (Lower Silesia)
2008/09 - Wielkopolska (Greater Poland)
2017/18 - Dolny Śląsk (Lower Silesia)

See also
FA Inter-League Cup
UEFA Regions' Cup
Spanish stage of the UEFA Regions' Cup
Trofeo delle Regioni (football)

External links
 Wielkopolska wygrała krajowy finał Regions' Cup

Football cup competitions in Poland
1999 establishments in Poland
Recurring sporting events established in 1999